The Madonna and Child with St. Anne, also known as Sant'Anna Metterza, is a painting of c. 1424-1425 by the Italian Renaissance painter Masaccio, probably in collaboration with Masolino da Panicale.  The painting is in the Galleria degli Uffizi in Florence, Italy, and measures 175 centimetres high and 103 centimetres wide.

The Virgin and Child, with its powerful volume and solid possession of space by means of an assured perspectival structure, is one of the earliest works credited to Masaccio. Except for one, the angels, very delicate in their tender forms and pale, gentle colouring, are from the more Gothic brush of Masolino; the angel in the upper right hand curve reveals the hand of Masaccio. The figure of St. Anne is much worn and hence to be judged with difficulty, but her hand, which seems to explore the depth of the picture-space, may well be an invention of Masaccio. Masaccio's work shows the influence of Donatello in its soft, rounded forms and realistic texture. The ‘Madonna and Child with Saint Anne’ was originally commissioned for the Sant’Ambrogio church in Florence. According to Vasari, “It was placed  in the chapel door which leads to the nuns’ parlour”.

The figure of Christ is that of a young child, a realistic presence, rather than a gothic cherub. This is also one of the first paintings to display the effect of true natural light on the figure; it is this invention which imparts the modelling of form so characteristic of Masaccio, and which would have a profound influence on the painting of the Italian Renaissance.

References

John T. Spike, Masaccio, Rizzoli libri illustrati, Milano 2002 
AA.VV., Galleria degli Uffizi, collana I Grandi Musei del Mondo, Roma 2003.
Pierluigi De Vecchi ed Elda Cerchiari, I tempi dell'arte, volume 2, Bompiani, Milano 1999. 

Paintings by Masaccio
1425 paintings
Paintings of the Madonna and Child
Angels in art
Paintings of Saint Anne